Mary Edith "Molly" Hide (24 October 1913 – 10 September 1995) was an English cricketer who played as a right-handed batter and right-arm medium bowler. She appeared in 15 Test matches for England between 1934 and 1954. She was one of the great early women cricketers in England, and captained England for 17 years, between 1937 and 1954. She played domestic cricket for Surrey. In 1973 she was president of the Women's Cricket Association.

Early life
Molly Hide was born in Shanghai, China and moved to England at the age of six. She learned to play cricket at the girls' school of Wycombe Abbey and later studied agriculture at Reading University.

Career
Hide represented Worcestershire in representative matches in 1932 and 1933 and toured Australia and New Zealand with Betty Archdale's first English women touring team to those countries. She scored a hundred in the Christchurch Test, where England defeated New Zealand in a one-sided match.

Hide was given the captaincy of the South of England team in 1936 and, one year later, that of England against the touring Australia. The series ended 1-1, Hide's major contribution was 5 for 20 in the second innings at Blackpool where England won by 25 runs. 

During World War II, she worked in her father's farm in Haslemere. Test cricket resumed after 11 years with a tour of Australia which England lost 0-1. Hide scored 63 & 124* in the drawn match at Sydney. She scored five hundreds in the tour including one in Colombo. She also captained England at home against Australia in 1951 and New Zealand in 1954. Hide was a quick scoring right-handed batsman and bowled medium-paced off-spinners. 

In her youth she also played lacrosse for England and was thus a dual international for England.  Hide never married.

According to G. D. Martineau,

Test centuries

See also 
 List of centuries in women's Test cricket

References

 GD Martineau, They made cricket, Museum Press, 1956

External links
 
 

1913 births
1995 deaths
Sportspeople from Shanghai
England women Test cricketers
Surrey women cricketers
People educated at Wycombe Abbey
Alumni of the University of Reading